Iliili is a village in the southwest of Tutuila Island, American Samoa. It is located seven miles inland, southwest of Pago Pago, between the villages of Futiga and Vaitogi. It is in Tuālāuta County.

Iliili is home to American Samoa's only golf course, which is an 18-hole golf course maintained by the Department of Parks and Recreation. It is 120 acres.

Demographics

Notable residents
Savali Talavou Ale – Speaker of the American Samoa House of Representatives (since 2007)
 Pita Elisara – American football offensive lineman
 A. P. Lutali – former Governor of American Samoa (1985–1989, 1993–1997)
 Tuia'ana T. Letuli - representative (1952 - 57) and police chief (1957 - 1967)
 Susana Leiato Lutali – former First Lady of American Samoa (1985–1989, 1993–1997)

References

Villages in American Samoa
Tutuila